This is a list of the metropolitan areas in Brazil, containing the legally defined metropolitan areas with more than one million inhabitants in Brazil, according to estimates published by IBGE.

Definitions
In Brazil, the terms metropolitan area (Portuguese: região metropolitana) and urban agglomeration (aglomeração urbana) have specific meanings. They are defined by federal and state legislation as collections of municipalities focused on "integrating the organization, planning and execution of public functions of common interest". An integrated development area (região integrada de desenvolvimento) is one of the two above structures that crosses state (or Federal District) boundaries.

Because these regions are formed by consent of municipalities, their composition can change over time due to municipal reorganization. These regions may not coincide exactly with boundaries of statistical Immediate Geographic Areas (formerly microregions) defined by IBGE, or with the broader definition of built-up urban area.

List

See also
 List of cities in Brazil by population
 Municipalities of Brazil
 List of municipalities of Brazil
 List of largest cities in Brazil by state
 List of metropolitan areas in the Americas
 Largest cities in the Americas
 Brazilian Institute of Geography and Statistics

References

Brazil

Brazil